Carson-Pegasus Provincial Park is a provincial park located in central Alberta, Canada, within Woodlands County.

It is accessed by Highway 32.

The park protects the boreal forest ecosystem with aspen, balsam poplar, balsam fir and white spruce, as well as the willow/alder shorelines, black spruce bogs, grass marshes, and fens. The park is also a fishing spot and a habitat for diverse mammals and birds.

See also 
List of provincial parks in Alberta
List of Canadian provincial parks
List of National Parks of Canada

References

External links 
Carson-Pegasus Provincial Park (Government of Alberta site)

Provincial parks of Alberta
Woodlands County